Trinidad History Museum is a local history museum in Trinidad, Colorado, United States. It is administered by History Colorado (the Colorado Historical Society).

Description
The museum presents the history of the town of Trinidad and the surrounding area in southeastern Colorado. It features a number of attractions on one block in the historic district of Trinidad. These include historic homes, gardens, and local treasures. The museum includes the Santa Fe Trail in its remit since the trail passes through the southeast corner of Colorado. It features several components including the Santa Fe Trail Museum, Baca House and Kitchen Garden, and Bloom Mansion and Heritage Gardens.

References

External links 
 Trinidad History Museum History Colorado
 Trinidad History Museum Sangres.com

History museums in Colorado
Museums in Las Animas County, Colorado
Santa Fe Trail
History Colorado